Glendale is a residential neighbourhood in the southwest quadrant of Calgary, Alberta. It is located south of 17th Avenue SW, east of Sarcee Trail and Signal Hill and west of 37 Street SW and Killarney. The Optimist Athletic Park is located in this community.

It is represented in the Calgary City Council by the Ward 6 councillor.

Demographics

Residents in this community had a median household income of $55,400 in 2000, and there were 10.2% low income residents living in the neighbourhood. As of 2000, 18% of the residents were immigrants. A proportion of 9.1% of the buildings were condominiums or apartments, and 20.1% of the housing was used for renting.

Education
The community is served by Glendale Elementary and Glenmeadow Elementary public schools, as well as by St. Gregory Junior High (Catholic).

See also
List of neighbourhoods in Calgary

References

External links
Glendale Community Association

Neighbourhoods in Calgary